Eritrea competed at the 2013 World Championships in Athletics in Moscow, Russia, from 10–18 August 2013. A team of 10 athletes was announced to represent the country in the event.

Results

(q – qualified, NM – no mark, SB – season best)

Men 

Track and road events

Women 
Track and road events

References

External links
IAAF World Championships – Athletes – Eritrea

Nations at the 2013 World Championships in Athletics
World Championships in Athletics
Eritrea at the World Championships in Athletics